Curtis Leroy "Clank" Blefary (July 5, 1943 – January 28, 2001) was an American professional baseball left fielder who played in Major League Baseball for the Baltimore Orioles (1965–1968), Houston Astros (1969), New York Yankees (1970–1971), Oakland Athletics (1971–1972) and the San Diego Padres (1972). A native of Brooklyn, New York, he batted left-handed and threw right-handed.

Career
Blefary grew up in Mahwah, New Jersey and attended Mahwah High School.

In an eight-season career, Blefary was a .237 hitter with 112 home runs and 382 RBI in 974 games.

During the 1965 Winter Meetings, he was one of three players along with Milt Pappas and Jack Baldschun whose names were originally submitted by the Cincinnati Reds in discussions of any transaction which would have sent Frank Robinson to Baltimore, but the Orioles balked at trading Blefary. Dick Simpson was sent to the Reds instead of Blefary to complete the deal. The following season, he was a member of the Orioles team that won the 1966 World Series.

Nicknamed "Clank" by Frank Robinson because of his below-average fielding abilities, Blefary started his career in the outfield, tried at first base, then switched to catcher, in an effort to keep his bat in the lineup. On April 27, 1968, he caught Tom Phoebus's no-hitter against the Red Sox.

On May 4, 1969, Blefary, who was playing first base participated in all of the Astros record-tying seven double plays in a game against the San Francisco Giants.

After a full season with the Astros, at the end of the  season he was traded to the Yankees for fellow Brooklynite, Joe Pepitone.

Blefary was used as a part-time player by the Yankees. He was dealt from the Yankees to the Oakland Athletics for Rob Gardner and Darrell Osteen on May 25, . After retiring in 1972, he tried unsuccessfully to continue his career in baseball as a coach. He worked as a sheriff, bartender, truck driver, and later owned a night club.

He played and coached in the 1977 season with the New Jersey Statesmen, a professional softball team in the American Professional Slo-Pitch League (APSPL), as did fellow MLB alumnus Joe Pepitone.  Blefary managed the team in 1978 but was fired mid-season.

Even as his health failed in his later years, he hoped to secure a professional coaching job, but his only connection with baseball was as a volunteer coach for Northeast High School in Fort Lauderdale.

Later life
In the last years of his life, Blefary suffered from chronic pancreatitis. He had hip replacement surgery in the mid-1990s and experienced a variety of health and financial problems, including alcoholism and depression. Blefary died at his home in Pompano Beach, Florida on January 28, 2001, at the age of 57 of chronic pancreatitis and other related ailments. His last wish was to be buried in Baltimore's Memorial Stadium. Although the park was nearly demolished when he died, his wife Lana was able to honor his request to scatter his ashes in Memorial Stadium. The Babe Ruth Museum supplied the home plate used in the penultimate game at the stadium and located it in the precise spot where it had been used. The ceremony was held on May 24, 2001. "He loved Baltimore, and he loved his fans," said his wife. "He was a lifelong student of the game."

Blefary's grandson, Anthony Servideo, was drafted in the third round of the 2020 Major League Baseball Draft by the Orioles. Servideo is a shortstop and played college baseball at the University of Mississippi.

References

External links

The Baseball Biography Project
The Deadball Era

1943 births
2001 deaths
Baltimore Orioles players
Deaths from pancreatitis
Houston Astros players
Mahwah High School alumni
Major League Baseball catchers
Major League Baseball first basemen
Major League Baseball outfielders
Major League Baseball Rookie of the Year Award winners
New York Yankees players
Oakland Athletics players
People from Mahwah, New Jersey
San Diego Padres players
Sportspeople from Brooklyn
Baseball players from New York City
Wagner Seahawks baseball players